Prkos Lasinjski is a village in central Croatia, in the municipality of Lasinja, Karlovac County.

History
Prkos Lasinjski suffered heavy demographic losses in the World War II with nearly 480 of its residents perishing. Out of those, 428 people were civilian victims of fascism and 23 were fallen partisans. During the WWII Genocide by the Croatian fascist Ustaše regime, on 21 December 1941, hundreds of Serbs from the village were taken to the Brezje forest and massacred.

Culture

Demographics
According to the 2011 census, the village of Prkos Lasinjski has 52 inhabitants. This represents 36.62% of its pre-war population according to the 1991 census.

The 1991 census recorded that 92.25% of the village population were ethnic Serbs (131/142),  2.11% were ethnic Croats (3/142), 2.82% were Yugoslavs (4/142), while 2.82% were of other ethnic origin (4/142).

Sights
 Memorial to the victims of fascism and fallen partisans in WW2

Notable natives and residents

References

Populated places in Karlovac County
Serb communities in Croatia